New Ulm can mean:

New Ulm, Minnesota, USA
New Ulm, Texas, USA
Neu-Ulm, a town in Bavaria, Germany
Neu-Ulm (district) in Bavaria, Germany